The Centre for Genomic Research (CGR) (Liverpool) is located on the University of Liverpool Campus, and was established by the Medical Research Council in partnership with the Natural Environment Research Council (NERC). The goal of this research centre is to provide DNA sequencing and bioinformatics services to the scientific community.

References

External links
 CGR web site
 NERC web site

Biological research institutes in the United Kingdom
Genetics in the United Kingdom
Genetics or genomics research institutions
Medical Research Council (United Kingdom)
Natural Environment Research Council
Research institutes in Merseyside
University of Liverpool